Wei Shou (506–572), courtesy name Boqi (伯起), was a Chinese author born in Quyang County in Julu Commandery (today Xingtai, Hebei). He wrote the Book of Wei, composed  in 554, an important Chinese historical text.

See also
Twenty-Four Histories

References

Cao, Daoheng, "Wei Shou". Encyclopedia of China, 1st ed.

506 births
572 deaths
Northern Wei historians
Northern Qi historians
6th-century Chinese historians
Northern Wei politicians
Politicians from Xingtai
Historians from Hebei
Northern Qi politicians
6th-century Chinese writers